Mahamed Habib N'Diaye (born 17 January 1986 in Miakaramandougou) is a football player from Mali who plays central defender.

N'Diaye has previously played for K.V. Kortrijk. He also had a brief spell with K.A.A. Gent in the Belgian First Division.

References

1986 births
K.A.A. Gent players
Malian footballers
Association football central defenders
K.V. Kortrijk players
Expatriate footballers in Belgium
Living people
21st-century Malian people